The Letter-Books of the City of London are a series of fifty folio volumes in vellum containing entries of the matters of in which the City of London was interested or concerned, beginning in 1275 and concluding in 1509. The volumes are part of the collection of the City of London Records Office, and are kept in the London Metropolitan Archives.

The volumes derive their name from being lettered from A to Z (with two odd volumes marked respectively &c. and AB) and again from AA to ZZ. Besides being known by distinctive letters, the earlier Letter-Books originally bore other titles, derived from the comparative size of each volume and the original colour of its binding. Letter-Book A is referred to as the "Lesser Black Book" (Parvus or Minor Liber Niger); Letter-Book B as the "Black Book" (Liber Niger); Letter-Book C as the "Greater Black Book" (Major or Maximus Liber Niger); Letter-Book D as the "Red Book" (Liber Rubeus); and Letter-Book E as the "White Book" or "New White Book of Writs and Memoranda" (Liber Albus or Liber Albus novus de brevibus et memorandis).

Content 

The books, written in scores of varying hands, are not in strict chronological sequence, but speak in detail of the business habits of Chamberlains of the City of London and Common Clerks in the times of the Plantagenets, and contain entries in English, French, and Latin. The lack of sequence in many entries is probably due to rough copies of the memoranda, or "remembrances," being kept in hand at times for a month or two together, or even longer, and then entered in the volumes without much regard to the chronological order of the facts they recorded. Also, at least in some cases, two sets of entries were being made in different parts of the volume at the same period; in the instance of the earliest letter books, no less than three of them were in use for receiving entries of memoranda for several years in common. The irregular, and at times haphazard, manner in which entries have been made in (at least) the first two Letter-Books, and their overlapping each other in point of chronology, may also be accounted for by each clerk having been in the habit of keeping in his own custody the books or calendars upon which he happened to be engaged for the time being.

The earlier volumes contain, amongst other things, the chief, if not the only existing, record of the proceedings of the Court of Common Council and Court of Aldermen prior to the fifteenth century, when they were first entered in separate volumes, known respectively as Journals and Repertories. The later volumes contain much that is also entered in the Journals and Repertories, but the concluding volumes of the series are almost wholly devoted to orphanage matters.

Letter-Books A and B are chiefly concerned with recognizances of debts. These recognizances have their value as illustrating the commercial intercourse of the citizens of London with Gascony and Spain in the thirteenth and fourteenth centuries, more especially in connection with wine and leather; the names of those sworn as "correctors" (coretaru), or licensed brokers, of those commodities, appear on the first page of Letter-Book A. Another prominent feature of both these books is the record of the Assize of Bread, as set from time to time by the municipal authorities; although also irregularly kept, with little respect paid to chronological order. The recognizances in Letter-Book A terminate in 1294, and are immediately followed by a series of deeds extending from 1281 to 1293. The remainder of the volume is occupied by miscellaneous matters and additions of a later date, inserted wherever space permitted.

The value of these earlier records was fully realised by Andrew Horn, the well-known jurist and sometime Chamberlain of the City, and John Carpenter, the City's famous Town Clerk. Both Horn and Carpenter drew largely upon these volumes for their own respective compilations of City customs and ordinances, the Liber Horn and the Liber Albus, the first book of English Common Law. Later on these books of "Remembrances", as they were sometimes called, were used by the chroniclers Robert Fabyan, John Stow, and others.

Preservation 
The exact nature in early times of the rules for the safe-keeping and seclusion of such City records as these is unknown. However, like other volumes of the City's records, the Letter-Books have been subject to misfortune. On the flyleaf of Letter-Book E, the following statement is written in a hand of the sixteenth century:

How the book went astray and what length of time it had been missing will probably never be known. However, considering that stringent regulations on the manner in which the City's records were written up and maintained by the four clerks or attorneys of the Mayor's Court were not set until 1537, that such a transient loss occurred is not surprising.

The contents of the Letter-Books were republished by the Corporation of London between 1899 and 1912 as the Calendar of letter-books of the city of London.

Notes

Citations

References

External links 
 Calendar of letter-books of the city of London: the full text of the Letter-Books, as reproduced in volumes in 1899, at British History Online.

13th-century books
14th-century books
15th-century books
16th-century books
City of London
History of London
14th century in England
15th century in England
Legal history of England
Medieval London